BCS Countdown is a television program broadcast by ESPN. The program focuses on the weekly BCS standings in college football and also includes interviews with players and coaches.

References

ESPN original programming
2010s American television series
College football studio shows